The Real Housewives of Sydney (abbreviated RHOS) was an Australian reality television series that premiered on Arena on 26 February 2017. Developed as an international installment of the American Real Housewives franchise and the third installment of The Real Housewives franchise by Matchbox Entertainment, following The Real Housewives of Melbourne and The Real Housewives of Auckland, it aired one season and focused on the personal and professional lives of several women living in Sydney, Australia.

The series was cancelled in 2019 after one season.

Overview and casting
On 3 September 2014, the production company for The Real Housewives of Melbourne, Matchbox Pictures, revealed they were filming another series, in Sydney or Gold Coast. A year later in September 2015, it was again reported that Matchbox Pictures were looking into filming a new series in the aforementioned cities, along with possible candidates. On 27 February 2016, The Real Housewives of Melbourne cast member, Gamble Breaux, revealed that she was assisting the production company on looking for talent in Sydney.

The Real Housewives of Sydney was officially announced on 16 May 2016. The Real Housewives of Sydney serves as the second spin-off, of The Real Housewives of Melbourne following The Real Housewives of Auckland. On 22 July 2016, the cast of the first season was announced. The show will follow seven sophisticated and vivacious women including Athena X Levendi Krissy Marsh, Lisa Oldfield, Nicole O'Neil, Matty Samaei, Melissa Tkautz, and Victoria Rees. The women are described by Foxtel as "charismatic and engaging" as well as women who enjoy "the extravagant, stylish and cosmopolitan lifestyle of Sydney." This marked the first time in the history of the franchise that a series has debuted with a total of seven women.
The filming for the ten-part series began filming in September, having The Real Housewives of Melbourne filming put on hold until 2017. Filming concluded on 20 December 2016.
The series premiered on 26 February 2017, and featured a total of twelve episodes. On 9 January 2017, a "meet the wives" trailer was released, which featured all housewives and their profession/notability in Sydney. The reunion for season one was filmed on 26 March 2017, taking 19 hours to film.

Episodes

References

External links

 

2017 Australian television series debuts
2017 Australian television series endings
2010s Australian reality television series
English-language television shows
Television shows set in Sydney
Sydney
Arena (TV network) original programming
Television series by Matchbox Pictures
Australian television series based on American television series
Women in Australia
Television shows filmed in Australia
2020s Australian reality television series